Francis "Frank" J. Doyle III (born 1963) is an American engineer and academic administrator. He is the dean of the Harvard John A. Paulson School of Engineering and Applied Sciences and the John A. and Elizabeth S. Armstrong Professor of Engineering and Applied Sciences. Doyle is also affiliated with the Division of Sleep Medicine of Harvard Medical School. On December 15, 2022 it was announced that Doyle will serve as the 14th provost of Brown University starting in the 2023 academic year.

In 2021, Doyle was elected a member of the National Academy of Engineering for insights into natural biological control systems and innovative engineering of diabetes control devices.

Biography
Francis J. Doyle III was born in Philadelphia in 1963. His family moved to Newark, Delaware when Francis was 2. His father worked as a chemical engineer.

Doyle completed his undergraduate studies at Princeton University in 1985, receiving a B.S.E. in chemical engineering. He received a M.S. (C.P.G.S.) in chemical engineering from Cambridge University in 1986, and Ph.D. in chemical engineering from the California Institute of Technology in 1991.

Doyle joined Harvard in 2015, becoming the first John A. Paulson Dean. A distinguished scholar in chemical engineering, he previously served as Associate Dean for Research at the University of California, Santa Barbara's College of Engineering, where he also served as chair of the Department of Chemical Engineering. At UCSB he was a founding co-Director of the UCSB-MIT-Caltech Institute of Collaborative Biotechnologies.

Prior to his appointment at UCSB, Doyle was a professor in the Department of Chemical Engineering at the University of Delaware (1997-2002), and was a professor in the School of Chemical Engineering at Purdue University (1992-1997). Between his graduate studies and his first academic appointment, he completed postdoctoral studies at the DuPont Company.

Research
As a scholar, Doyle applies systems engineering principles to the analysis of regulatory mechanisms in biological systems. His work includes the design of drug-delivery devices for diabetes (i.e., the artificial pancreas); modeling, analysis, and control of gene regulatory networks underlying circadian rhythms; and computational analysis for developing diagnostics for post-traumatic stress disorder. Doyle also applies control schemes to nonlinear, multivariable, constrained industrial processes such as particulate systems and pulp and paper operations, and works on control aspects of sheet/film processes.

Honors and recognition
Doyle has received a number of honors throughout his career, including:
 National Academy of Engineering (NAE) Member, 2021
 National Academy of Medicine (NAM) Member, 2016
 AACC Control Engineering Practice Award, 2015
 American Association for the Advancement of Science (AAAS) Fellow, 2011
 American Institute for Medical and Biological Engineering Fellow, 2009
 International Federation of Automatic Control Fellow, 2009
 Institute of Electrical and Electronics Engineers (IEEE) Fellow, 2008
 Computing in Chemical Engineering Award (AIChE CAST Division), 2005
 Alexander von Humboldt Research Fellow, 2001-2002
 ASEE Ray Fahien Award, 2000
 Office of Naval Research Young Investigator Award, 1996-1999
 ASEE Section Outstanding Teacher Award (Illinois/Indiana), 1996
 National Science Foundation National Young Investigator Award, 1992-1997

He has also held leadership positions in professional societies including the IEEE (as President of the Control Systems Society) and as Vice President of the International Federation for Automatic Control (IFAC), among others.

Personal life

Frank is married to Diana Rodriguez, and they have 3 children. In his free time, Frank enjoys racing sailboats, and has competed in a number of regattas during and since college, including the 2011 Transpac Race. His other hobby is refereeing soccer, and he is currently certified in several organizations including AYSO (National Referee), U.S Soccer (Grade 7 Referee), and NISOA.

References

1963 births
Living people
John A. Paulson School of Engineering and Applied Sciences faculty
American chemical engineers
Princeton University School of Engineering and Applied Science alumni
Alumni of the University of Cambridge
California Institute of Technology alumni
Members of the National Academy of Medicine
Fellows of the American Association for the Advancement of Science
Fellow Members of the IEEE
Humboldt Research Award recipients
University of California, Santa Barbara faculty
University of Delaware faculty
Purdue University faculty
Fellows of the American Institute for Medical and Biological Engineering
DuPont people
Fellows of the International Federation of Automatic Control
Engineers from Pennsylvania
Engineers from Delaware
People from Newark, Delaware